The 1979 NAIA World Series was the 23rd annual tournament hosted by the National Association of Intercollegiate Athletics to determine the national champion of baseball among its member colleges and universities in the United States and Canada.

The tournament was played, for the first time, at Herschel Greer Stadium in Nashville, Tennessee.

Hometown team David Lipscomb (43–11) defeated High Point (38-15-1) in a single-game championship series, 5–4, to win the Bisons' second NAIA World Series and second in three years.

David Lipscomb pitcher Kal Koenig was named tournament MVP.

Bracket

See also
 1979 NCAA Division I baseball tournament
 1979 NCAA Division II baseball tournament
 1979 NCAA Division III baseball tournament

Reference

|NAIA World Series
NAIA World Series
NAIA World Series
NAIA World Series